

Events
February – Kim Kilbey starts hosting Australia's Funniest Home Video Show, replacing long-time host Jo Beth Taylor.
12 February – British Swiss children's animated TV series Pingu (which started off as a segment on the Seven Network's The Book Place) makes its debut on ABC, starting off with the first two episodes at 8:25am. It will later broadcast several more episodes on 24 March at 3:55pm and again in several months on weekdays at 10:25am, 9:25am, 7:25am (for Sundays), 8:25am (for a second time) and at 4:55pm (until 1 January 1999 in all states and on 8 January 1999 in Western Australia).
16 February – The pink rabbit Mixy from The Ferals/Feral TV presents her very own children's weekday morning block on ABC starting from 7:30am to 10:00am.
16 February – British children's TV series Teletubbies debuts on ABC.
18 February – Australian talk show The Panel debuts on Network Ten.
24 February – Australian hospital drama series All Saints debuts on the Seven Network.
27 March – Darwin finally gets a second commercial television station when TND-34 opens, taking a Seven Network affiliation.
WIN Television WA is granted a licence to broadcast to regional & remote Western Australia.
10 May – Australian drama series SeaChange debuts on ABC.
24 June – In the magic moment of Neighbours 13-year history, here was one now-infamous incident, Karl Kennedy (Alan Fletcher) has a massive fight with Susan Kennedy (Jackie Woodbourne) about his feud with serial bombshell Sarah Beaumont (Nicola Charles), and slaps him in the face very hard.
29 June – British sitcom Father Ted premieres on the ABC two years after its debut on the Nine Network.
20 July – Hey Hey It's Saturday launches its Red Faces documentary series and spin off Gonged But Not Forgotten, premieres at 8:30pm, on the Nine Network
31 July – The Wiggles' first self-titled television series, screens on the Seven Network.
22 August – British pop duo the Lighthouse Family perform on the Nine Network variety program Hey Hey It's Saturday.
5 October – Pokémon makes it debut on Network Ten.
12 October – Nine Network debuts a brand new talk show called Strassman presented by American ventriloquist and comedian David Strassman at 9:00pm.
22 November – The 1995 film Babe premieres on the Seven Network.
27 November – After 25 years, The Midday Show is retired by the Nine Network. A Current Affair draws with a final goodbye with Ray Martin in the hot-seat before retiring for the very last time. Martin was replaced by Mike Munro from December 1998. Martin returns to the program 5 years later. On the same night, Brian Naylor retires from reading Melbourne's National Nine News after 20 years; he is replaced by Peter Hitchener, who remains in this role as of today.
December – The remote Central & Eastern Australia markets are aggregated, with Imparja taking a Nine Network affiliation & Seven Central (formerly QSTV) taking a joint Seven & Network Ten affiliation.
20 December – The pay television station, Disney Channel Australia introduced pay television Foxtel to a children's group called The Wiggles who debuted in a TV special taking place in Disneyland, California titled The Wiggles in Disneyland, this was later screened on the Seven Network. Future Hollywood actor Hugh Jackman hosts the 1998 Carols in the Domain, live on the Seven Network.
21 December – Network Ten debuts a brand new children's series aimed at pre-schoolers called In the Box, replacing The Music Shop.
24 December – Australian children's TV series Misery Guts which only ran for 13 episodes premieres on Nine Network.

Debuts

Domestic

International

Subscription television

Domestic

International

Telemovies

International

Specials

International

Changes to network affiliation
This is a list of programs which made their premiere on an Australian television network that had previously premiered on another Australian television network.  The networks involved in the switch of allegiances are predominantly both free-to-air networks or both subscription television networks. Programs that have their free-to-air/subscription television premiere, after previously premiering on the opposite platform (free-to air to subscription/subscription to free-to air) are not included. In some cases, programs may still air on the original television network. This occurs predominantly with programs shared between subscription television networks.

Domestic

International

Subscription premieres
This is a list of programs which made their premiere on Australian subscription television that had previously premiered on Australian free-to-air television. Programs may still air on the original free-to-air television network.

Domestic

International

Television shows

ABC
 Mr. Squiggle and Friends (1959–1999)
 Four Corners (1961–present)

Seven Network
 Wheel of Fortune (1981–1996, 1996–2003, 2004–06)
 Home and Away (1988–present)
 Blue Heelers (1994–2006)
 The Great Outdoors (1993–present)
 Today Tonight (1995–present)

Nine Network
 Today (1982–present)
 Sale of the Century (1980–2001)
 A Current Affair (1971–1978, 1988–present)
 Hey Hey It's Saturday (1971–1999)
 Midday (1985–1998)
 60 Minutes (1979–present)
 Australia's Funniest Home Video Show (1990–2000, 2000–2004, 2005–present)
 The AFL Footy Show (1994–present)
 The NRL Footy Show (1994–present)
 Water Rats (1996–2001)
 Burgo's Catch Phrase (1997–2001, 2002–2004)
 The Price is Right (1993–1998)

Network Ten
 Neighbours (Seven Network 1985, Network Ten 1986–present)
 GMA with Bert Newton (1991–2005)
 Totally Full Frontal (1998–1999)

Ending / Resting this year

See also
 1998 in Australia
 List of Australian films of 1998

References